Jiliya is a place in Nagaur District of Rajasthan, India.  It was a Princely Thikana in British India. It is developing as a tourist spot to explore the natural scenic beauty of Rajasthan. The majority of the population is involved in agricultural and trade activities. NGOs such as Sankalp Volunteer Society are active in this region of Rajasthan and foreigners participate in the "Jiliya Project" which is one of the five projects of this NGO in India.

General information

 Religion: 99% of population are Hindus
 Geographical Location: 13 km from Kuchaman City
 Temperature: Max. 44 °C in June, Min. 1 °C in January
 Monsoon Season: June to July
 Annual Rainfall: 412 mm
 Census Code: 01892800

History of Jiliya

During British rule in India Abhaypura or Jiliya was a Princely Thikana of the Princely State of Jodhpur. Princely State Abhaypura was half of Maroth state and was founded around 1683 AD (1740 BS) by Maharaja Bijay Singh, third son of Maharaja Raghunath Singh Mertia Rathore of Maroth. In 1820 AD it accepted nominal allegiance of Jodhpur State. It had 40 villages of Maroth; later, after a treaty it became a Thikana of Marwar and is now called as Thikana Jiliya and has 14 villages, as the rest of the villages were given as appanages or jagirs to younger brothers.

As per Indira Gandhi National Centre for the Arts, the paintings of the Man Mandir Temple of Maroth, Rajasthan best depict the art form of the 17th Century Rajputana.

Title
The Title of the rulers "Tazim Naresh Maharaja Shri" (The Great Hon'ble King) is derived from the Urdu word Tazeem (Tazim) meaning Respect or Honour, which describes their special position as a Dual Tazimi Thikana in the Princely State of Jodhpur whom the Jodhpur Maharaja receives in Darbar by rising from throne, taking steps, and hugging, and are exempted from appearance in Courts of Law in Civil Cases; and Naresh meaning "King" or "Maharaja" or "Raja".

A volunteer program known as the Jiliya Project, run by the Sankalp Volunteer Society NGO, is active in the region as Nagaur is one of the economically underdeveloped districts of the state. Being a desert area, it also suffers from lack of water which makes the situation even worse for agricultural activities.

Medical and infrastructure facilities
There are few Government and private medical aid centers, hospitals, dispensaries in Jiliya, and nearby Hospitals are at Kuchaman City. 
Hospitals & dispensaries in Jiliya.
Health facilities: Two government hospital & 3-4 dispensaries in Jiliya.

References

Villages in Nagaur district